Night Surfer is a full-length album by American singer-songwriter Chuck Prophet. It was released in the U.S. on September 23, 2014, through Yep Roc Records.

The album was recorded in San Francisco and Nashville, and mixed by Paul Q. Kolderie.

Critical reception
AllMusic wrote: "Whether he's hitting the highway on tour in a beat-up van, harvesting weed in Mexico, or jotting down mental notes about strangers in the park, Prophet has a great eye for details, and these 12 songs are often powerfully evocative and acidly funny, short stories of a memorable life where fate often puts a twist in the tale." Esquire thought that the influence of Prophet's hometown, San Francisco, "is evident in the still psychedelic but also jamming, occasionally neurotic vibe." The Chicago Tribune called Night Surfer "an album that distills some of Prophet's entrancing dichotomies: It's a sloppy and refined, deeply rooted, contemporary garage-rock gem with glimmers of 1960s soul in the production, Alejandro Escovedo in the singing and the Beat poetry tradition in the writing."

Track listing

 "Countrified Inner-City Technological Man"
 "Wish Me Luck" 
 "Guilty As a Saint"
 "They Don't Know About Me and You"
 "Lonely Desolation"
 "Laughing on the Inside"
 "If I Was a Baby" (Ezra Furman)
 "Ford Econoline"
 "Felony Glamour"
 "Tell Me Anything (Turn to Gold)"
 "Truth Will Out (Ballad of Melissa and Remy)"
 "Love Is the Only Thing"

Personnel

In alphabetical order
Peter Buck – E-Bow, Guitar (12 String), Guitar (12 String Electric), Guitar (Resonator), Guitars, Hi String Guitar (Acoustic) 
Chris Carmichael – Viola, Violin
James DePrato – Banjo, composer, Guitar, Guitars 
Richard Dodd – Mastering
Stephanie Finch – Vocals
John Foster – Design
Ezra Furman – Composer
Austin Hoke – Cello
Jim Hoke – Woodwind
Brad Jones – Bass, Bells, engineer, producer, String Arrangements
Klipschutz – Composer
Paul Q. Kolderie – Engineer, Mixing
Rusty Miller –  Arp String Ensemble, Bass, Bells, Hammond B3, Mellotron, Organ, Piano, Vocals, Vox Continental
Suzy Poling – Photography
Prairie Prince – Drums, Percussion
Chuck Prophet – Composer, Guitar, Guitar (12 String Acoustic), Guitars, Primary Artist, producer, Unknown Instrument, Vocals, Wurlitzer
Bill Rieflin – Drums, Percussion
Bill Wesemann – Executive Producer
Matt Winegar – Guitar, Keyboards, Sitar
Terry Yerves – Assistant Engineer

References

  Liner Notes from Night Surfer

External links
 Chuck Prophet's biography on Yep Roc's website Yep Roc Records Chuck Prophet - Yep Roc Records

2014 albums
Yep Roc Records albums